The Mita Congregation is a Christian denomination with headquarters in Puerto Rico. The congregation has chapters in the United States, Canada, Venezuela, Colombia, Ecuador, Chile, Panama, Costa Rica, Mexico, El Salvador, Spain, Italy and the Dominican Republic.

They have an estimation of 100,000 members worldwide.

History 
The Mita Congregation was formed when Mita said that God had chosen her to found a church.

The congregation was formed in at the Casa de la Diosa Mita of Arecibo in 1940, but in 1947 the church was relocated to Hato Rey.

Mitas, as her followers are called, believe that Juanita García Peraza was chosen by God and that she became the Prophet of the Holy Spirit in its third manifestation. First, as the omnipotent father in Jehovah, then in his beloved son Jesus Christ and in its third manifestation with a new name revealed Mita, name of the Holy Spirit of God.

According to their beliefs, the Holy Spirit once acted through Juanita García Peraza and anointed Teófilo Vargas Seín (October 23, 1921 - January 18, 2021) as the first anointed of God in what they call the new manifestation of God, the third manifestation, the Holy Trinity, the father, son and the Holy Spirit. According to the church, Vargas was renamed Aarón and before Peraza died in 1970, she called Aarón and told him to take care of his church and he was the spiritual leader of the Mita Congregation until he lost his battle to extensive cardiovascular conditions, passing away on January 18, 2021, in San Juan, Puerto Rico.

Aarón was very known in the church and in the communities as a very enthusiastic and people-oriented leader, spending hours and hours of his days helping those in need, visiting hospitals and visiting the poorest communities.

He's also very known for bringing an extensive growth in the number of church members, taking it to many countries around The Americas and Europe. All this due to his vast campaigns of preachings where he would do 2, 3 and even 5 church services in one day in different communities.

The Congregation is now led by Rosinin Rodriguez, who had been named by Aarón in 2012 as his successor and the Spiritual Mother of the church.

Doctrine
The doctrine of the church is based on the original Reina-Valera Spanish translation of the Bible. They are trinitarian, believing in Jehovah, Jesus Christ and the Holy Spirit (Mita), who they believe "is on earth, that His new name is Mita and that, through Aarón, He guides His Church and guides it through truth and justice towards salvation". Aarón is considered God's prophet for today, and through him God's message of cleansing, freedom from sin, and unity is brought to the world. "Mita en Aarón" (Mita in Aaron) is a slogan of the Mita Congregation.

Mita members always clarify that when they talk about Mita in their hymns or preachings they are not referring to Juanita Garcia Peraza, but referring to the new name of the Holy Spirit who, at some point in the late 40s, called Juanita by His own name.

References

External links 
 

Christian denominations founded in the United States
Religion in Puerto Rico
Christian organizations established in 1940
1940 establishments in Puerto Rico